DYBE (106.3 FM), on-air as K-Five 106.3, is a radio station owned by Quest Broadcasting Inc. and operated by 5K Broadcasting Network, Inc. Its studios and transmitter are located at Puentebella Subd., Purok 5, Brgy. Taculing, Bacolod.

History
DYBE first signed on the air in 1993 as Killerbee 106.3 with a Top 40 format. On April 29, 2013, this station, along with the other Killerbee stations, were relaunched under the Magic moniker (adopted from its then-parent station). It went off the air sometime in 2021.

In November 2022, the station returned to the airwaves as K-Five under the management of 5K Broadcasting Network, which operates 103.9 Radyo Bandera Sweet FM. Currently on test broadcast, it airs a classic hits format.

References

Radio stations in Bacolod
Radio stations established in 1993
1991 establishments in the Philippines
Quest Broadcasting